Kavach may refer to:

 Kavach (anti-missile system), an Indian anti-missile naval decoy system
 Kavach (train protection system), Indian Railways train protection system
 Kavach (TV series), a Hindi supernatural horror drama television series
 Carona Kavach, an Indian COVID-19 contact tracing, syndromic mapping and self-assessment digital service

See also 
 Kvatch (disambiguation)
 Kavatch, a dialect of the Nemi language